The Health Protection (Coronavirus, Restrictions) (Entry to Venues and Events) (England) Regulations 2021 (SI 2021/1416) is a statutory instrument (SI) made on 13 December 2021 in response to the COVID-19 pandemic. The regulations, which covered England only, were introduced following increasing concerns about the Omicron variant. They mostly came into effect on 15 December 2021 and expired on 26 January 2022.

The regulations applied to nightclubs and some other high-risk venues, as well as to larger venues and events hosting more than 500 people. Organisers were required to bar access to members of the public who could not demonstrate their valid COVID-19 status via the NHS COVID Pass or with official confirmation of a recent test result. A valid status required the holder to be vaccinated with two doses at least 14 days earlier, or to have taken a PCR or lateral flow test within the last 48 hours with negative result. 

Under 18s were exempt, as were people attending in order to provide a service or to sell goods, and those who could not be vaccinated for medical reasons.

Legal basis 
The regulations were introduced by way of a Statutory Instrument made by the Secretary of State for Health and Social Care using emergency powers available under the Public Health (Control of Disease) Act 1984. The regulations themselves state the legal basis for using such powers, namely "the serious and imminent threat to public health which is posed by the incidence and spread of severe acute respiratory syndrome coronavirus 2 (SARS-CoV-2) in England"; the restrictions are said to be "proportionate to what they seek to achieve, which is a public health response to the threat."

Commencement and geographical scope 
The regulations applied in England only (the rules were different in Scotland, Wales and Northern Ireland). They mostly came into effect on 15 December 2021, though some amending regulations (not discussed here) came into effect the day before.

Restrictions on entry 
The regulations restricted entry into certain venues, and into certain types of event. Restricted venues were called Category A venues, and the restricted events divided up into categories B, C and D, as defined in the Restricted venues and events section below.

The person responsible for the restricted venue or event was required to check attendees' COVID-19 status, and they had to generally permit access only to those whose status was valid. Exempt persons could also be admitted, as could those who could prove they were participating in a clinical trial or that they could not be vaccinated for medical reasons.

Valid COVID-19 status 
'Valid' COVID-19 status means:

 vaccinated with two doses of an approved vaccine (or one of the single-dose Janssen vaccine) at least 14 days earlier; or
 have taken a PCR or lateral flow test within the last 48 hours, with negative result

The status could be proved by means of:

 the NHS COVID Pass, or an approved UK or international equivalent
 the EU Digital COVID certificate
 a North American Certificate
 a valid text or email confirmation of the recent test result.

Spot checks 
Generally, all attendees had to have their COVID-19 status individually checked, but where many attendees were expected to arrive at the same time and the resultant crowd would present a safety or security risk, the organiser was able to apply to the local authority for permission to check some proportion of the attendees only.

Restricted venues and events 

In these definitions:

 An attendee who leaves their seat only to use the toilet facilities, to eat or drink, or to leave, is not treated as moving around
 People who have attended in order to provide services or to sell goods are generally not included in the counts.

Exempt events 
Certain types of event were exempt, and were not subject to the restrictions. Not all exemptions applied to all categories of venue and event. The table below summarises the exemptions and gives the categories to which each applied:

Exempt persons 
Certain classes of people were exempt from the restrictions on entry. They included:

 anyone under 18
 anyone at the venue or event in order to provide services or to sell goods
 anyone participating in organised sport or fitness activity
 police officers and various others attending in an official capacity.

Local authority powers 
Local authorities were given the power to enforce the regulations via Coronavirus Improvement Notices and Coronavirus Immediate Restriction Notices.

Offences and penalties 
Breach of the regulations could result in the issuance of a fixed penalty notice (with penalties on a sliding scale of up to £10,000) or prosecution.

Expiry 
The bulk of regulations expired at the end of 26 January 2022, after the prime minister Boris Johnson told the House of Commons on 19 January that they would not be further extended and would expire as scheduled.

House of Commons vote 
On 14 December 2021, the day before the majority of the provisions were due to enter into force, the government allowed a vote in the House of Commons. The regulations were approved, in spite of a rebellion by more than a quarter of Conservative MPs, who objected to these further restrictions. This was the largest rebellion of Conservative MPs against any proposal made during the Premiership of Boris Johnson; however the measures were still passed due to the support of Labour MPs. The split of the vote on the regulations was as follows:

List of amendments by date

References

Bibliography
   Text was copied from this source, which is available under an  Open Government Licence v3.0. © Crown copyright
 

Statutory Instruments of the United Kingdom
2021 in England
COVID-19 pandemic in England
Public health in the United Kingdom
2021 in British law
Law associated with the COVID-19 pandemic in the United Kingdom